Maurice Henrijean (born 1903, date of death unknown) was a Belgian athlete. He competed in the men's pole vault at the 1924 Summer Olympics and the 1928 Summer Olympics.

References

External links
 

1903 births
Year of death missing
Athletes (track and field) at the 1924 Summer Olympics
Athletes (track and field) at the 1928 Summer Olympics
Belgian male pole vaulters
Olympic athletes of Belgium
Place of birth missing